Joseph Philibert LeBlanc (April 20, 1890 – June 13, 1964) was a Canadian politician. He served in the Legislative Assembly of New Brunswick as member of the Liberal party from 1935 to 1939.

References

1890 births
1964 deaths
20th-century Canadian politicians
New Brunswick Liberal Association MLAs
People from Carleton-sur-Mer